Time Freak (also known as Time After Time) is a 2018 American science-fiction comedy-drama film written and directed by Andrew Bowler. It was released in limited release and on digital on November 9, 2018.

Plot
Stilman, a physics student and genius, is dumped by his girlfriend and attempts to find what caused her unhappiness and the break-up itself. Stilman and his best friend Evan look over their relationship and sort different days into happy and bad memories which may or may not have caused Debbie to break up with Stilman.

In the midst of the break-up Stilman finally figures out how to create a time machine. Stilman and Evan travel back in time to the day Stilman and Debbie met. Stilman plans on doing things differently and will know if the plan worked if the last text Debbie sent disappears. Evan and Stilman then travel to a movie date with Evan, Stilman, Debbie, Carly and Ryan. Stilman shows them his favorite movie but they do not appreciate it and mock the movie. Stilman becomes upset and insults Carly. They go back in time repeatedly as the situation goes wrong. Finally, Stilman works the situation the way he wants in which Debbie looks at him lovingly. Later, they sit at Evan's house where Evan attempts to leave a message for his future self so that he does not flunk out and he can graduate.

They go to another location in a building where there is supposed to be a party. Evan gets in an elevator while Debbie and Stilman take the stairs to the roof, but there is no party and nobody else. The door closes behind them and they are locked out, Debbie begins to panic but Stilman unlocks the door easily, leaving Debbie impressed.

Stilman relives a moment over and over and they revisit many other times trying to stop the break-up. Evan meets a girl and the machine freezes leaving the two stuck. Later, Stilman admits to Debbie his dislike of Ryan.

The time machine is fixed eventually but only allows for forward time travel, so Stilman has to get everything right. Stilman and Debbie go to a camp party where Stilman is able to keep Debbie happy.
Upon waking up the next day, Stilman finds that the text has disappeared and Debbie no longer breaks up with him. Evan and Stilman return to the present time.

Stilman calls Debbie and goes over to her apartment where they have sex. They plan a birthday dinner for Stilman. Debbie is over an hour late for the dinner and their table is given away when Stilman gets upset. They make up and go to a waffle place. Stilman feels bad about getting mad despite it being her fault. Evan is upset about the small amount of change that has come to his life. Later, Debbie texts Stilman saying they should talk again. Stilman begins working on the time machine again.

Two years later, Debbie and Stilman are married and having dinner with their friends including Evan and his new girlfriend. Debbie has a recording set up for a new album, she reveals she does not really care about it and is less inclined to be a musician. Debbie brings up the fact that they never fight or disagree about anything.

Stilman sees Evan about being addicted to using the machine and that it was making their life too perfect and making Debbie unhappy.

Debbie suggests having a baby to be happy again. In the morning, he gives Debbie a kiss and then Evan comes and asks him not to destroy the time machine. Evan reveals he uses it often and Stilman locks him out, but Debbie lets him in again. They both fight each other and Debbie becomes upset when she finds the time machine. Stilman explains what he is going to do and Evan jumps in. They go back to the first day Debbie and Stilman met and Evan chases him with his car to ensure he comes up with the theorem for the time machine. Stilman reveals they cannot go back as his phone is not hooked up. Stilman kisses Debbie and then begins to leave her. Her consciousness from the future comes back and they begin to argue but eventually make up.

Cast 
 Asa Butterfield as Stillman
 Sophie Turner as Debbie
 Skyler Gisondo as Evan
 Will Peltz as Ryan		
 Aubrey Reynolds as Blue Ribbons
 Mary Elizabeth Boylan as Sophia
 Jillian Joy as Carly
 Marilyn Miller as Meditator / Dining Patron / Party Guest
 Mark Blockovich as Diner Patron

Production
The movie was filmed in Utah.

Reception

Box office
Time Freak grossed $10,003 in the United States and Canada and $506,081 in other territories for a worldwide total of $516,084, plus $62,108 with home video sales.

References

External links 
 
 
 

2018 films
2018 romantic comedy-drama films
American romantic comedy-drama films
American science fiction comedy-drama films
American science fiction romance films
Features based on short films
Films about time travel
Films scored by Andrew Lockington
Films shot in Utah
2010s science fiction comedy-drama films
2010s English-language films
2010s American films